Dmitri Alekseyev (born 1973) is a Russian professional footballer.

Dmitri (Dmitry, Dimitri, etc.) Alekseyev (Alekseev, Alexeyev, etc.) may also refer to:

 Dmitri Alexeev (born 1947), Russian pianist
 Dimitriy Alekseyev (born 1966), Soviet and Russian luger

See also
 Dmitry Alekseyevich, Count Milyutin
 Dmitry
 Alexeyev